This is a list of the squads that qualified for the 2013 Champions League Twenty20.

Brisbane Heat

Chennai Super Kings

Faisalabad Wolves

Highveld Lions

Kandurata Maroons

Mumbai Indians

Otago Volts

Perth Scorchers

Rajasthan Royals

Sunrisers Hyderabad

Titans

Trinidad and Tobago

References

External links
2013 Champions League Twenty20 squads on ESPN Cricinfo

Champions League Twenty20 squads